Dale DaBone (born January 8, 1972) is an American pornographic actor and director. He has appeared in more than 500 adult movies.

DaBone started in the adult film industry in 1998. DaBone had stepped away from the industry in 2003 and returned to the adult industry in 2010.

Personal life
DaBone was born and raised in Greensboro, North Carolina. He dated professional tennis player Jennifer Capriati from 2003 to 2009.

Select filmography

Awards
 2003 AVN Award – Best Actor in a Video (Betrayed By Beauty)
 2004 AVN Award – Best Group Sex Scene in a Film (Fade To Black)
 2011 XBIZ Award – Performer Comeback of the Year
 2012 AVN Award – Best Actor (Elvis XXX: A Porn Parody)

References

External links
 
 
 
 

1972 births
Living people
American male pornographic film actors
Pornographic film actors from North Carolina
Film directors from North Carolina